The 1962 Queen's Birthday Honours in New Zealand, celebrating the official birthday of Elizabeth II, were appointments made by the Queen on the advice of the New Zealand government to various orders and honours to reward and highlight good works by New Zealanders. They were announced on 2 June 1962.

The recipients of honours are displayed here as they were styled before their new honour.

Knight Bachelor
 Robert James Kerridge – of Auckland. For public services.

Order of Saint Michael and Saint George

Companion (CMG)
 Lieutenant-Colonel Kenneth Wharton Fraser  – Dominion president of the New Zealand Returned Services' Association.
 Foss Shanahan – deputy secretary of External Affairs and deputy head of the Prime Minister's Department.

Order of the British Empire

Knight Commander (KBE)
Civil division
 Alfred Thomas Carroll  – of Wairoa. For services to the Māori people.

Commander (CBE)
Civil division
 Hermione Ruth Herrick  – of Christchurch. For outstanding service to the girl guide movement in New Zealand for over 30 years.
 Stanley Dixon Reeves – of Gisborne. For services to farming.
 Douglas Ogilvie Whyte – of Wellington. For services to industry and commerce.

Military division
 Group Captain Anthony Howard Marsh   – Royal New Zealand Air Force.

Officer (OBE)
Civil division
 Ernest Alfred Adams – of Christchurch. For services to the community, especially in social-welfare work.
 Frederick Cameron  – lately medical superintendent to the Levin Hospital and Training School.
 William Thompson Churchward. For services as Crown solicitor at Blenheim for many years.
 John Alexander Colquhoun – of Palmerston North. For services to education and to local government.
 James Joseph Maher  – of Trentham. For services to the community.
 Hugh Morison – of Mangatainoka. For services to farming and local government.
 Ronald Macgregor Hutton-Potts – of Invercargill. For services to journalism and broadcasting.
 Hone Heke Rankin  – of Kaikohe. For services among the Māori people, especially in the North.
 John Richard Reid – of Lower Hutt. For services to sport, especially cricket.
 The Reverend James David Salmond – of Dunedin. For services to the community, especially in connection with youth work and Christian education for the Presbyterian Church of New Zealand.

Military division
 Commander John Foster McKenzie – Royal New Zealand Navy.
 Lieutenant-Colonel Malcolm John Mason   – Royal New Zealand Army Service Corps (Territorial Force).
 Wing Commander Francis Eugene Fennessy – Royal New Zealand Air Force.

Member (MBE)
Civil division
 Maurice Ballantine Baker – Director of Agriculture, Cook Islands.
 Evelyn Love Dowling – of New Plymouth. For services to music.
 Frank Charles Eyles – of Whangārei. For services to the community in local government and social welfare.
 Michael Christian Gudex – of Hamilton. For services to education and horticulture.
 Charles William Henderson – of Johnsonville. For services to the community, especially to blind children.
 Norah Mary Hudson – of Nelson. For services to the community, especially to crippled children.
 Kassie Bowring McCreanor – of Christchurch. For services to education.
 Thomas McCristell – of Balclutha. For services to the community, especially to farming and education.
 Ethel McQuilkin  – of Timwald. For social welfare services.
 Winifred Lascelles Jenner Mellsop  – of Auckland. For services to the community.
 David Norman Perry – of Ōpōtiki. For services to the Māori people.
 Eric Gordon Smith – of Rangiora. For services to farming.
 Peter George Snell – of Auckland. For services in the field of athletics.
 James Edward Francis Stokes  – of Greymouth. For services to the community, especially in local-government affairs.
 James Leece Sutton  – of Invercargill. For services to the community, especially as president of the Southland Crippled Children's Association.
 Mete Kingi Takarangi – of Putiki. For services to the Māori people, especially among the Wanganui tribes.
 Albert Wheeler – of Dunedin. For services to Scottish cultural activities.
 Harold Egmont Young  – of Raumati Beach. For services to the community.

Military division
 Lieutenant-Commander (Sp.) Robert Stewart Fleming – Royal New Zealand Naval Volunteer Reserve.
 Major Bernard Wellesley Jermyn Brown  – New Zealand Cadet Corps.
 Warrant Officer Second Class Duncan Garner MacPherson – Royal New Zealand Infantry Corps (Territorial Force).
 Major Brian Matauru Poananga – New Zealand Regiment (Regular Force).
 Major Garth Turon Seccombe  – Royal New Zealand Armoured Corps (Regular Force).
 Flight Lieutenant Patrick Emmett Hugh Duffin – Royal New Zealand Air Force.
 Warrant Officer Gordon Ernest Tynan – Royal New Zealand Air Force.

Companion of the Imperial Service Order (ISO)
 Thomas Pound – formerly assistant under-secretary, Lands Department, and a Government member of the Public Service Boards of Appeal.
 Percy Walton Smallfield – lately director-general of the Department of Agriculture.

British Empire Medal (BEM)
Civil division
 Elizabeth Florence Bennett – sergeant, New Zealand Police Force, Auckland.
 Jessie Jeanie Dobbie Fleming – constable, New Zealand Police Force, Auckland.
 Alexander Gordon Hogg – constable, New Zealand Police Force, Eastbourne.
 Malcolm McLaren – farm manager, Arohata Institution, Prisons Service.
 James Anthony Newsome. For services when the Hotel Metropole, Akaroa, was destroyed by fire.

Military division
 Chief Petty Officer Patrick Hartley Barker – Royal New Zealand Navy.
 Chief Engine Room Artificer Norman Noel Dewson – Royal New Zealand Navy.
 Chief Engine Room Artificer Daniel Sheldrake – Royal New Zealand Navy.
 Chief Electrician Ralph Roland Wheeler – Royal New Zealand Navy.
 Sergeant (temporary) Rushby Carl Midgley Brown – New Zealand Regiment (Regular Force).
 Staff-Sergeant Joseph Ernest Dunn – Royal Regiment of New Zealand Artillery (Regular Force).
 Staff-Sergeant Ronald James Shelley – Royal New Zealand Army Service Corps (Regular Force).
 Corporal Lewis Tuka Williams – New Zealand Regiment (Regular Force).
 Sergeant Norman Henry Bartholomew – Royal New Zealand Air Force.
 Sergeant William Alexander Kenneth Currie – Royal New Zealand Air Force.

Air Force Cross (AFC)
 Squadron Leader Harold Gordon Moss – Royal New Zealand Air Force.
 Squadron Leader Edward John Ernest Tompkins – Royal New Zealand Air Force.

Queen's Commendation for Valuable Service in the Air
 Lieutenant Barry David Gordon – Royal New Zealand Air Force.
 Flight Lieutenant Te Waaka Hemi Morete – Royal New Zealand Air Force.

References

Birthday Honours
1962 awards
1962 in New Zealand
New Zealand awards